is a Japanese light novel series written by Sakon Kaidō and illustrated by Taiki. It began serialization online in 2015 on the user-generated novel publishing website Shōsetsuka ni Narō. It was acquired by Hobby Japan, who published the first light novel volume in November 2016 under their HJ Bunko imprint. Nineteen volumes have been released as of September 2022. A manga adaptation with art by Kami Imai has been serialized via Hobby Japan's Comic Fire website since December 2016. It has been collected in ten tankōbon volumes. Both the light novel and manga have been licensed in North America by J-Novel Club. An anime television series adaptation by NAZ aired from January 9 to April 16, 2020.

Premise
In the year 2043, the virtual reality MMORPG Infinite Dendrogram is released, featuring the ability to perfectly simulate players' five senses. Nearly two years later, Reiji Mukudori enters the world of Infinite Dendrogram and assumes the name "Ray Starling", and upon his arrival, he is joined by his more experienced brother Shuu and his Embryo companion Nemesis. As Ray explores the world of Infinite Dendrogram, he learns to make a life for himself there and meets different kinds of friends and foes.

Characters
 / 

 The protagonist. A soon-to-be college freshman that bought a copy of Infinite Dendrogram two years after the game's release. He chooses to begin his adventure in the Kingdom of Altar, where he becomes a Paladin. During the battle of Gideon, he loses his left arm but is able to defeat both Hugo and Franklin, which significantly boosts his reputation within the game and earns him the nickname "the Unbreakable."

 Ray's Embryo, a special kind of artificial intelligence that provides the player with information and tactical support. She transforms into Ray's weapon, a sword, and like all Embryos, she can evolve depending on Ray's progress throughout the game. During their journey to Gideon, she attains a second form, a halberd.

 Ray's brother, already an experienced player of Infinite Dendrogram. He constantly wears a bear costume to hide his true identity as the King of Destruction, the player with the highest kill count in all of Altar. His Embryo is a battleship. He reveals himself during Franklin's invasion of Gideon.

 A player Ray helps in a battle. He later gains the ability to tame and charm monsters. In real life, he is the son of a detective and a thief and he inherited his deductive skills from them. After his parents died in a plane crash, Rook found a letter in which his father was asked to discover the mysteries of Infinite Dendrogram.

 Rook's Embryo.

 A Master and High Driver of the Dryfe Imperium. He specializes in piloting giant robots called Magingear, which he can power up using his Embryo Cocytus. In real life, Hugo is actually a girl called Yuri Gautier and she created the Hugo character in an attempt to emulate the knights in shining armor from theater plays she enjoyed. He is member of the Triangle of Wisdom and goes along with Franklin's plan to invade Gideon, thinking it will keep casualties to a minimum and bring the Altar-Dryfe war to a quicker end. As the invasion starts, however, Rook makes him realize Franklin never had any intention of sparing the citizen and he actually wants to destroy the city and kill as many as possible, causing Hugo to betray him and instead assist the city's defenders. As Ray confronts Franklin, however, Hugo steps in to defend him, revealing that Franklin is actually his older sister, Francesa. With Franklin losing the battle of Gideon, he removes Hugo from the Triangle of Wisdom in an attempt to protect him.

 Hugo's Embryo, who keeps her true identity secret. Her real name is Cocytus and she can merge with Hugo's Magingear in order to strengthen its attacks.

 A journalist working for the Dendrogram Information Network. She provides Ray with information about the latest events in the world of Infinite Dendrogram. She has experience in martial arts and her Embryo, Arc-en-Ciel, is a gun. Despite having an under-leveled Embryo, she is experienced enough to defeat higher-ranking players with ease. In the real world, she used to be a manga artist who created "Marie Adler" as the main character of her manga until she hit writer's block and used Infinite Dendrogram as a way to live vicariously as Marie. She befriends Elizabeth, the second princess of Altar, and attempts to save her when Franklin kidnaps her during the invasion of Gideon.

 An NPC serving as Vice Commander for the army of Altar. She asks for Ray's help in looking for her sister Milianne and later assists his group while defending Gideon from Franklin's forces.

 Liliana's younger sister. She gets lost in an abandoned orchard but Ray saves her.

 One of the artificial intelligences overseeing Infinite Dendrogram. He explains the basic elements of the game to Ray and explains him that Nemesis has the same functional capabilities as Cheshire and his fellow administrators.

 The top duelist in Altar. Ray and Nemesis meet him while exploring Altar's underground labyrinth and he advises them to visit Gideon, the Duel City, so they can become stronger. He fights Xunyu in Gideon's fighting tournament and narrowly beats him.

 A high-ranking player from the Huang He Empire who travels to Gideon in order to enter its fighting tournament.

 The second princess of Altar who is kidnapped and held hostage by Dr. Franklin.

 A high-ranking player who partakes in Gideon's fighting tournament. She wields the Embryo Hraesvelgr.

 A high-ranking player who partakes in Gideon's fighting tournament. She wields the Embryo Poseidon.

 A scientist working for the Dryfe Imperium and leader of Dryfe's most powerful clan, the Triangle of Wisdom. His Embryo is Pandemonium, a large monster holding a monster-producing factory on its back. He initially uses a penguin suit and the "Dr. Flamingo" alias to travel across Altar without arousing suspicion, but he later reveals his true identity everyone in Gideon as he begins his plan to end the war between Altar and Dryfe. He gains an interest in Ray after watching him subvert his plans to weaken Altar, to the point he tricks Ray into drinking a potion that informs Franklin of his status and weapons and later uses that information to create a monster with the express purpose of killing Ray. As the battle of Gideon ends, Ray defeats Franklin, but not before Hugo reveals that Franklin is actually his older sister Francesa. With his forces depleted, Franklin removes Hugo from the Triangle of Wisdom, both in an attempt to protect him and to undo any moral restrains he himself may have in his goal towards beating Ray.

 He is a member of Mohwak League under the leadership of Mohwak Omega.

Media

Light novels

It was originally published by Sakon Kaidō as a free-to-read web novel on Shōsetsuka ni Narō in 2015 and Hobby Japan published the first volume in print with illustrations by Taiki in November 2016. As of September 1, 2022, nineteen volumes have been published. The light novel is licensed by J-Novel Club.

Manga

The light novel series was adapted into a manga series by Kami Imai and published by Hobby Japan, with ten volumes released as of June 1, 2022. The manga is also licensed by J-Novel Club.

Anime
An anime television series adaptation was announced on January 25, 2019. Tomoki Kobayashi directs the series, with NAZ producing the animation, Yūichirō Momose handling series composition, Masahiko Nakata designing the characters, and Kenji Hiramatsu composing the series' music. It aired from January 9 to April 16, 2020, on AT-X, Tokyo MX, BS11, and SUN. Aoi Yūki performs the series' opening theme song "Unbreakable", while Aya Uchida performs the series' ending theme song "Reverb". Funimation had licensed the series for a simulcast and a simuldub. Following Sony's acquisition of Crunchyroll, the series was moved to Crunchyroll. It runs for 13 episodes.

Notes

References

External links
  at Shōsetsuka ni Narō 
  
  
 

2016 Japanese novels
Anime and manga based on light novels
Anime postponed due to the COVID-19 pandemic
Anime productions suspended due to the COVID-19 pandemic
Crunchyroll anime
HJ Bunko
Hobby Japan manga
Isekai anime and manga
Isekai novels and light novels
J-Novel Club books
Light novels
Light novels first published online
Medialink
Naz (studio)
Seinen manga
Shōnen manga
Shōsetsuka ni Narō